Wilde is a surname. Notable people with the name include:

In arts and entertainment

In film, television, and theatre
 Wilde a 1997 biographical film about Oscar Wilde
 Andrew Wilde (actor), English actor
 Barbie Wilde (born 1960), Canadian actress
 Brian Wilde (1927–2008), British actor
 Cornel Wilde (1915–1989), American actor and film director
 Hagar Wilde (1905–1971), screenplay writer
 Lois Wilde (1907–1995),  American actress, model, dancer, and beauty contest winner
 Marty Wilde (born 1939), British rock and roll singer and actor; father of Kim and Ricky Wilde
 Olivia Wilde (born 1984), American actress
 Patrick Wilde, British television, stage and screenwriter
 Sonya Wilde (born 1939), American actress
 Ted Wilde (1893–1929), comedy writer and director of silent movies

In music
 Andrew Wilde (pianist) (born 1965), English classical pianist
 Danny Wilde (musician) (born 1956), American musician and founding member of The Rembrandts
 David Wilde (born 1935), British pianist and composer
 Jinian Wilde, British singer, part of Uniting Nations and other musical projects
 Kim Wilde (born 1960), British pop singer and pop culture figure
 Marty Wilde (born 1939), British rock and roll singer and actor; father of Kim and Ricky Wilde
 Ricky Wilde (born 1961), British songwriter, musician, and record producer
 Wilbur Wilde (born 1955), Australian saxophonist

In other arts
 Eduardo Wilde (1844–1913), Argentine politician, writer, and physician
 Jane Wilde (1821–1896), Irish political activist, poet, and folklorist; mother of Oscar Wilde
 John Wilde (1919–2006), American painter associated with Magic Realism
 Liz Wilde (born 1971), American radio personality
 Nurit Wilde (born 1971), Israeli-born photographer, socialite, and occasional actress
 Oscar Wilde (1854–1900), Irish writer

In government, law, and politics
 Eduardo Wilde (1844–1913), Argentine politician, writer, and physician
 Fran Wilde (born 1948), New Zealand politician
 James Plaisted Wilde, Baron Penzance (1816–1899), British judge, rose-breeder, and proponent of the Baconian theory of the works of Shakespeare
 John Wilde (jurist) (1590–1669), English lawyer and politician
 Louis J. Wilde (1865–1924), American banker and politician
 Thomas Wilde, 1st Baron Truro (1782–1858), Lord Chancellor of England

In sport
 Jimmy Wilde (1892–1969), Welsh world boxing champion
 Joaquin Wilde (born 1986), American professional wrestler
 Sam Wilde, English rugby league footballer
 Walter Wilde (1908–1968), Somerset cricketer

In science and technology
 Henry Tingle Wilde (1872–1912), English chief officer on the RMS Titanic
 Henry Wilde (engineer) (1833–1919), British engineer and inventor of the self-energizing dynamo
 Krzysztof Wilde (born 1966), Polish engineer, rector of Gdańsk University of Technology
 William Wilde (1815–1876), Irish eye and ear surgeon, writer on medicine, archaeology and folklore, father of Oscar Wilde
 Winston Wilde, American sexologist

In other fields
 Dorothy Wilde (1895–1941), Anglo-Irish socialite
 Michael Wilde (born 1952), English businessman

See also
 De Wilde
 Dewilde
 Wild (surname), list of people with the surname Wild
 Vilde

Notes

Surnames
English-language surnames
Surnames of English origin